Simon Lelic is a British novelist, writing mysteries or thrillers.

Life and career
Lelic was born in 1976 in Brighton. He studied history at the University of Exeter and then took a post-graduate course in Journalism. He worked as a freelancer and in business-to-business publishing before becoming a novelist, and has also owned an import/export company. His first novel, The Rupture (2010) won a Betty Trask Award in 2011. He has also written the Haven series of young adult thrillers; the first book, The Haven, was published in 2019.

Published works
 Rupture (US: A Thousand Cuts) (Picador/Viking, 2010)
 The Facility (Mantle, 2011)
 The Child Who (Mantle, 2012)
 The House (US: The New Neighbors) (Berkley, 2017)
 The Liar's Room (Berkley, 2019)
 The Search Party (Berkley, 2020)
 The Hiding Place (Penguin, 2022)

References

External links
Official website
Books by Simon Lelic at Publishers Weekly

Living people
1976 births
British male novelists
21st-century British male writers
21st-century British novelists
People from Brighton
Alumni of the University of Exeter